The West Orange Times & Observer is an American paid newspaper published by Observer Media Group (OMG). It is available for delivery in western Orange County, Florida. It was founded and first published in 1904.

History
The West Orange Times & Observer was first published in 1904, but not by that name. In 1970, George Bailey, a Korean War veteran, bought the Winter Garden Times which he renamed the West Orange Times. It was acquired by OMG in 2014.

OMG is headquartered in Sarasota, Florida, and West Orange Times & Observer is now part of a family of twelve newspapers in Florida, some of which were founded by OMG, others were acquired by OMG. Most of them now utilize the corporate brand of "Observer" in the title which came from Longboat Observer, the first OMG-owned paper.

As of 2019, the West Orange Times & Observer and the Southwest Orange Observer (Windermere, Dr. Phillips and Horizon West), both free publications have a combined circulation of 31,489 copies and are distributed weekly on Thursdays.

References

External links

West Orange Times & Observer at issuu

Newspapers published in Florida
Publications established in 1904
Orange County, Florida
1904 establishments in Florida
Weekly newspapers published in the United States